Frank David Greene (born April 21, 1963) is an American trumpet player, author, and speaker, based in New York City. Originally from Ft. Meade, Maryland, United States, he was raised in Northern California. His musical talents were recognized at an early age, as he was appointed lead trumpet in the Alum Rock Jazz Band in San Jose, California (director Bill Nicolosi), and again lead trumpet at the famed "One O'Clock Lab Band" at the University of North Texas (director Neil Slater). He is best known for his Lead Trumpet work with Maynard Ferguson, Christian McBride, Frank Foster, Frank Wess, Bob Mintzer, Dizzy Gillespie All Star Big Band, Clark Terry, Jon Faddis, Nicholas Payton, and Roy Hargrove. He is currently known for his work on the CBS television program Late Show with David Letterman, as part of the CBS Orchestra.

Discography

With Christian McBride
Bringin' It (Mack Avenue, 2017)

References

Paul Shaffer and the World's Most Dangerous Band members
American trumpeters
American male trumpeters
Living people
1963 births
Christian McBride Big Band members